Angus Stuart (born 8 August 1965) is an Australian bobsledder. He competed in the two man event at the 1988 Winter Olympics.

References

External links
 

1965 births
Living people
Australian male bobsledders
Olympic bobsledders of Australia
Bobsledders at the 1988 Winter Olympics
Place of birth missing (living people)